Oklahoma State University–Stillwater (officially Oklahoma State University; informally Oklahoma State, OK State, OSU) is a public land-grant research university in Stillwater, Oklahoma. OSU was founded in 1890 under the Morrill Act. Originally known as Oklahoma Agricultural and Mechanical College (Oklahoma A&M), it is the flagship institution of the Oklahoma State University System that holds more than 35,000 students across its five campuses with an annual budget of $1.5 billion. The main campus enrollment for the fall 2019 semester was 24,071, with 20,024 undergraduates and 4,017 graduate students. OSU is classified among "R1: Doctoral Universities – Very high research activity". According to the National Science Foundation, OSU spent $198.8 million on research and development in 2021.

The Oklahoma State Cowboys and Cowgirls have won 52 national championships, which ranks fourth in most NCAA team national championships after Stanford University, University of California, Los Angeles, and University of Southern California . The Oklahoma State Cowboys wrestling is the most successful NCAA Division I program of all time in any sport. As of 2021, Oklahoma State students and alumni have won 34 Olympic medals (21 gold, 5 silver, and 8 bronze). The university has produced 29 Goldwater Scholars, 18 Truman Scholars, 18 Udall Scholars, and 48 Fulbright Scholars, astronauts, and a billionaire. OSU is ranked top 10 nationally and top 100 in the world for contributions to United Nations Sustainable Development Goals.

Students spend part of the fall semester preparing for OSU's Homecoming celebration, begun in 1913, which draws more than 40,000 alumni and over 70,000 participants each year to campus and is billed by the university as "America's Greatest Homecoming Celebration." The Oklahoma State University alumni network exceeds 250,000 graduates.

History

On December 25, 1890, the Oklahoma Territorial Legislature finally gained approval for Oklahoma Territorial Agricultural and Mechanical (A&M) College, the land-grant institution established under the Morrill Act of 1862. The legislature specified that the college was to be within Payne County. Such an ambiguous description created a rivalry among towns in the county, with Stillwater ultimately gaining the campus. Upon statehood in 1907, "Territorial" was dropped from its title.

The first students assembled for class on December 14, 1891. For two and a half years, classes were held in local churches, until the first academic building, later known as Old Central, was constructed and dedicated on June 15, 1894, on the southeast corner campus. It was surrounded by flat plowed prairie.

In 1896, Oklahoma A&M held its first commencement with six male graduates. The first Library was established in Old Central in one room shared with the English Department.  The first campus building to have electricity, Williams Hall, was constructed in 1900. Because of its turreted architecture, it was referred to as the "Castle of the Prairies"; It survived until 1969.

One of the earliest campus buildings was also a barn, used as part of an agricultural experiment station, which was served by a large reservoir pond created in 1895. The barn burned down in 1922, but the pond, enlarged and remodeled in 1928 and 1943, is now known as Theta Pond, a popular campus scenic landmark. In 1906, Morrill Hall was completed and became the principal building on campus. A fire gutted the building in 1914, but the outside structure survived intact, and the interior was reconstructed.

On-campus housing at Oklahoma A&M College began in 1910, with the opening of the Boys' Dormitory. Later renamed Crutchfield Hall, the Historic American Buildings Survey said it was significant as "... the first permanent boy's dormitory in Oklahoma ... [and] the sole surviving example of a pre-1930 utilitarian dormitory that is characteristic of modified Italian Renaissance Revival architecture". Crutchfield Hall later served the School of Music and the College of Engineering, Architecture, and Technology before it was ranked as outdated and demolished in 1995.

Also opened in 1910 was the Women's Building, a dorm for female students that also containing a dining hall, home economics classes, and a women's gymnasium. It was later named Garner Hall. Today it is known as the Bartlett Center for the Studio Arts and houses the Gardiner Art Gallery.

By 1919 the campus included Morrill Hall, the Central Building, the Engineering Building (now Gundersen Hall), the Women's building, the Auditorium (replaced later by the Seretean Center for Performing Arts), the Armory-Gymnasium (now the Architecture Building) and the Power Plant.

At the beginning of World War II, Oklahoma A&M was one of six schools selected by the United States Navy to give the Primary School in the Electronics Training Program (ETP), also known as Naval Training School Elementary Electricity and Radio Materiel (NTS EE&RM). Starting in March 1942, each month a new group of 100 Navy students arrived for three months of 14-hour days in concentrated electrical engineering study. Cordell Hall, the newest dormitory, was used for housing and meals; lectures and lab sessions were held in the Engineering Building. Professor Emory B. Phillips was the Director of Instruction. ETP admission required passing the Eddy Test, one of the most selective qualifying exams given during the war years. At a given time, some 500 Navy students were on the campus, a significant fraction of the war-years enrollment. The training activity continued until June 1945 and served a total of about 7,000 students; among these was Robert B. Kamm, a future professor and president of Oklahoma State University. During some of the war years, the Navy also operated a Yeoman training activity for WAVES and SPARS on this campus.

Much of the growth of Oklahoma A&M and the architectural integrity of the campus can be attributed to Henry G. Bennett, who served as the school's president from 1928 to 1950. Early in his tenure, Dr. Bennett developed a strategic vision for the university campus's physical expansion. The plan was adopted in 1937, and his vision was followed for more than fifty years, including the predominant Georgian architecture style that permeates the campus. He intended the focal point to be a centrally located library building: this was the Edmon Low Library, which opened in 1953. Another major addition to the campus during the Bennett years was the Student Union, which opened in 1950. A complete renovation and further expansion of the building began in 2010.

Oklahoma A&M's global engagement at an institutional level began in the 1950s when President Bennett was appointed in 1950 to be the first director of US President Harry Truman’s “Point Four Program,” a technical assistance program for developing countries. As part of the Point Four program, Oklahoma A&M College entered into an agreement in 1952 with the government of Ethiopia to establish a technical high school, an agricultural university, and an agricultural extension service there. Faculty and staff from the Stillwater campus traveled to Ethiopia and established Jimma Agricultural Technical School (now Jimma University), the Imperial Ethiopian University of Agriculture and Mechanical Arts (now Haramaya University), and an agricultural and research station at Debra Zeit. In recognition of the contributions of the OSU staff, Ethiopian Emperor Haile Selassie visited the Stillwater campus in 1954, the first foreign head of state to visit Oklahoma and the only one to visit Stillwater.

On May 15, 1957, Oklahoma A&M changed its name to the Oklahoma State University of Agricultural and Applied Sciences, to reflect the broadening scope of its curriculum. Oklahoma Gov. Raymond Gary signed the bill authorizing the name change passed by the 26th Oklahoma Legislature on May 15, 1957. However, the bill only authorized the Board of Regents to change the college's name, a measure they voted on at their meeting on June 6. However, the name was quickly shortened to Oklahoma State University for most purposes, and the "Agricultural & Applied Sciences" name was formally dropped in 1980. Subsequently, the Oklahoma State University System was created, with the Stillwater campus as the flagship institution and several outlying branches: OSU-Institute of Technology in Okmulgee (1946), OSU-Oklahoma City (1961), OSU-Tulsa (1984), and the Center for Health Sciences also in Tulsa (1988).

In 2005, OSU announced its "Campus Master Plan", a campaign to enhance academic, athletic, and administrative facilities. Over $800 million is earmarked for campus construction and renovation over twenty years. The Plan calls for an "athletic village", where all of the university's athletic facilities will be located on the main campus. To accomplish this goal, the athletic department bought all (or nearly all) the property north of Boone Pickens Stadium up to McElroy between Knoblock and Washington streets. The city of Stillwater and property owners criticized this land gram.  While the vast majority of the real estate was rental property appealing to college students, a few owners were longtime residents. A lone holdout in this parcel of land sued OSU over their right to use eminent domain to condemn and acquire their land. The case was decided in favor of the university. The project includes constructing an indoor practice facility for most sports, a soccer stadium/outdoor track, a tennis complex, and a baseball stadium.

In 2006, OSU received a gift of $165 million from an alumnus T. Boone Pickens to the university's athletic department, and in 2008 received another gift from Pickens, of $100 million for endowed academic chairs. It was the largest gift for academics ever given in the state.  Ethical concerns have been raised by the media questioning the propriety of some of the Pickens' gifts, which were in media reports about the propriety of how some of the Pickens gifts have been made, were immediately returned to Pickens, and then placed in hedge funds owned by Pickens' companies  In February 2010, Pickens announced that he was pledging another $100 million to fund a scholarship endowment as part of a $1 billion fund-raising campaign titled "Branding Success." The pledge brought the total pledged or contributed to OSU by Pickens to over $500 million.

On October 24, 2015, during the annual homecoming parade, Adacia Chambers drove her vehicle into a crowd of people, killing 4 people and injuring 47. She faced 2nd-degree murder charges.

Colleges 
Oklahoma State University offers nearly 200 undergraduate degree majors through six Colleges:
 Ferguson College of Agriculture (Previously the College of Agricultural Sciences and Natural Resources)
 College of Arts and Sciences
 College of Education and Human Sciences
 College of Engineering, Architecture, and Technology
 Spears School of Business
 Center for Veterinary Health Sciences

OSU also has its main medical campus in Tulsa, Oklahoma called the Oklahoma State University Center for Health Sciences. While a separate campus in the OSU System, the medical campus is jointly accredited with OSU-Stillwater as one institution. It houses the following schools and colleges:

 College of Osteopathic Medicine
 School of Biomedical Sciences
 School of Forensic Sciences
 School of Healthcare Administration
 School of Allied Health

The medical campus has an affiliation with Oklahoma State University Medical Center for clinical training and offers residency/fellowship opportunities. Also with the medical school, OSU established a campus in Tahlequah, Oklahoma, the capital of the Cherokee Nation and the nation's first, and currently only, tribally-affiliated medical school.

In 2020, the College of Education and Human Sciences was created, which merged the College of Human Sciences and College of Education, Health, and Aviation into a single college. In August 2021, the university announced the creation of the Oklahoma Aerospace Institute for Research and Education (OAIRE).

OSU provides further opportunities for select students to study through the Honors College.

The graduate degree programs of all colleges are administered through the Graduate College.

The Center for Veterinary Health Sciences (CVHS) has three academic Departments: Veterinary Pathobiology, Physiological Sciences, and Veterinary Clinical Sciences. Each of the three academic departments share responsibility for the four-year professional curriculum leading to the Doctor of Veterinary Medicine (D.V.M.) degree. The interdepartmental Veterinary Biomedical Sciences graduate program offers MS and Ph.D. degrees. It also offers ECFVG and PAVE programmes for foreign-trained veterinarians.

The School of Global Studies and Partnerships (prior to 2017 the School of International Studies) offers a Masters of Science in Global Studies, as well as serving as the administrative hub for the university's international activities. It incorporates several units, including:
School of Global Studies Graduate Program
Wes Watkins Center for International Trade Development
Study Abroad/National Student Exchange 
International Students and Scholars 
English Language Institute

Admissions
For the Class of 2023 (enrolling Fall 2019), OSU received 15,277 applications and accepted 10,691 (70.0%), with 4,200 enrolling.  The middle 50% range of SAT scores for enrolling freshmen was 530-635 for evidence-based reading and writing, 510-630 for math, and 1040-1255 for the composite.  The middle 50% ACT score range was 19-27 for math, 21-27 for English, and 21-28 for the composite.

Rankings and reputation

It has been named a Truman Honor Institution for its success in producing Truman scholars.
OSU is ranked top 10 nationally and top 100 in the world for contributions to United Nations Sustainable Development Goals.
OSU School of Accounting ranks among nation's top 50 accounting schools.
OSU is the sixth most prolific institution in the U.S. based on publications in the top 10 regional science journals, and ranks 17th in the world (Growth and Change: A Journal of Urban and Regional Policy).
 The school of Entrepreneurship was recognized as one of the top 25 schools in the nation
Among U.S. schools with Master of Business Administration programs, OSU is ranked No. 73 out of nearly 500. In addition, Master in Business Analytics and Data Science is ranked among top 20 in the nation.
OSU places at 68th among public doctoral engineering colleges
OSU is one of five U.S. universities where Sun Grant Research Initiative programs have been established by the U.S. Congress in the Sun Grant Research Initiative Act of 2003 for the purposes of researching and developing sustainable and environmentally-friendly bio-based energy alternatives.
The Math Department has been recognized by the American Mathematics Association as one of four innovative programs in the nation and has produced four Sloan Fellowship winners.
The Oklahoma Mesonet, a state-of-the-art network of environmental monitoring stations that is an OU-OSU partnership, won a special award from the American Meteorological Society (AMS), the nation's leading professional society for those in the atmospheric and related sciences at the National Weather Center.
OSU is headquarters for the International Ground Source Heat Pump Association, which has members from as far away as Sweden, Japan, Australia, England and South Africa.
OSU is home to Fire Protection Publications and the International Fire Service Training Association, the largest publisher of fire and emergency services books in North America.
Since 2010, OSU has hosted SpeedFest, a collegiate and high school unmanned systems competition held annually in April at the OSU Unmanned Aircraft Flight Station. Originally focused on remote control aircraft design and flight demonstration only, the event has recently expanded to include autonomous ground vehicles. It typically attracts around 1,000 spectators.
OSU is home to the Unmanned Systems Research Institute which focuses on autonomous systems research, particularly unmanned aircraft. The campus wide institute was created in 2015. In addition to STEM and outreach, USRI serves the campus and statewide UAS needs. Along with Counter-UAS projects, high-profile activities include using unmanned aircraft for advanced weather observations. The institute has led several large national efforts, including NSF and NASA ULI programs, in this area.
OSU's Homecoming was awarded the Council for Advancement and Support of Education (CASE) Seal of Excellence. Presented each year by the Oklahoma State University Alumni Association, "America's Greatest Homecoming Celebration" began in 1913 and today draws more than 70,000 alumni and fans back to Stillwater for events like the Harvest Carnival, Walkaround and Sea of Orange Parade. It is widely regarded as one of the best homecoming celebrations in the U.S.
Each year the School of Entrepreneurship hosts the "Experiential Classroom", an intensive 3-day seminar for entrepreneurship educators. It has been widely recognized as being the top program of its kind. In 2011, the program hosted entrepreneurship faculty from 29 states, 17 countries, and 65 different universities.

Student life

Housing
Current university-owned housing options include 31 residence halls, more than 15 dining options, and six family-first apartment complexes. In recent years, on-campus housing has been undergoing significant transformation. Student living was previously dominated by traditional residence halls; however, apartment-style buildings now comprise approximately half of the living quarters. In 2005, the high-rise Willham North and South residence halls that once dominated the Stillwater skyline were demolished and replaced with the Village suites on its site. Iba Hall, another traditional hall, was closed in 2007, but was reopened in 2011 due to an increase of incoming freshman. In 2017, Iba Hall underwent significant renovations which lasted through most of that year, before reopening in time for the Fall 2018 semester.

Iba, Parker, Wentz and Stout Halls continue to offer traditional residence hall accommodations. In addition, three residence halls were opened in the fall of 2015, collectively known as the University Commons. North houses female students, south houses male students, and west is a co-ed facility that also houses the twenty-four-hour service desk for the area. Although Kerr-Drummond was slated to be closed with the opening of the University Commons, Drummond was reopened in fall 2015 due to increased occupancy of campus housing. Kerr was closed and is scheduled for demolition in the coming years. Apartments for single students are Bost, Davis, Morsani-Smith, Peterson-Friend, Kamm, Sitlington and Young Halls. Housing in suite-style accommodations are provided in the named Village CASNR (College of Agricultural Science and Natural Resources), Village HS (Human Sciences), Village C, Village D, Village E and Village F. Deluxe suites are provided in Patchin & Jones, Bennett, Zink & Allen, and Stinchcomb & Booker Halls. Graduate students and families are offered accommodations in seven apartment "neighborhoods" with a variety of floor plans and amenities: Brumley, Demaree, Prosser, Stevens, West, and Williams.

Additionally, a number of learning communities and special interest housing options are available, providing opportunity for students who share interests or majors to live together. Most of these communities occupy certain floors of buildings or halls, rather than consisting of separate buildings. Included among the options are: FIT (Freshman in Transition, College of Agricultural Sciences and Natural Resources), athletic training, career exploration (College of Arts and Sciences), computer science floor, engineering floors, health and sciences floor, HS housing (College of Human and Environmental Sciences), journalism and broadcasting housing, Kamm Leadership House, Ketchum House (Native American interests), James Building (Young Engineers House), Maude's Quad (Women in Engineering House), Recovery House (students recovering from drug and/or alcohol dependence), Spanish House (language immersion), Spears School of Business House, Stout Honors housing (University's Honors Program), Uhuru House (African Centered Cultural House), Wellness House, and The Transfer Zone (transfer students).

Fraternity and sorority life
Oklahoma State University's fraternities and sororities celebrated 100 years of existence at OSU in 2008.

Social fraternities and sororities at Oklahoma State are divided among four councils: Panhellenic, Interfraternity, National Pan-Hellenic and Multicultural.

Thirteen national Panhellenic sororities have chapters at OSU. They are: Alpha Chi Omega, Alpha Delta Pi, Alpha Omicron Pi, Alpha Xi Delta, Chi Omega, Delta Delta Delta, Gamma Phi Beta, Kappa Alpha Theta, Kappa Delta, Kappa Kappa Gamma, Phi Mu, Pi Beta Phi, and Zeta Tau Alpha.

Twenty-two fraternities make up the Interfraternity Council. Member fraternities include: Alpha Gamma Rho, Alpha Sigma Phi, Alpha Tau Omega, Beta Theta Pi, Beta Upsilon Chi, Delta Tau Delta, FarmHouse, Kappa Alpha Order, Kappa Sigma, Lambda Chi Alpha, Phi Delta Theta, Phi Gamma Delta, Phi Kappa Sigma, Phi Kappa Tau, Tau Kappa Epsilon, Pi Kappa Alpha, Sigma Alpha Epsilon, Sigma Chi, Sigma Nu, Sigma Phi Epsilon, Sigma Tau Gamma, and Theta Chi.

NPHC member organizations are historically black fraternities and sororities. As of the 2018–2019 school year, Alpha Phi Alpha, Delta Sigma Theta, Omega Psi Phi, Phi Beta Sigma, and Zeta Phi Beta have chapters at OSU.

The Multicultural Greek Council is the umbrella organization for additional minority Greek letter groups. Member organizations include Alpha Pi Omega, Kappa Delta Chi, Sigma Lambda Alpha, Sigma Lambda Beta, Omega Delta Phi.

Athletics

Stats:
NCAA Division I-A
Conference: Big 12
Major Rivalries: University of Oklahoma Sooners
Minor Rivalries: University of Texas Longhorns, University of Kansas Jayhawks, Iowa State University Cyclones (wrestling)
NCAA Championships: 52 (#4 after Stanford, USC, and UCLA)
 Wrestling: 34
 Golf: 11
 Basketball: 2 (1945 and 1946)
 Baseball: 1 (1959)
 Cross Country: 4 (1954, 2009, 2010, 2012)

National Championships not sanctioned by NCAA: 5
 Equestrian: 4
 Football: 1 (1945)
Athletic Director: Chad Weiberg

Football

20 conference titles – 32 bowl games played – 1988 Heisman Trophy winner and single season rushing record (Barry Sanders).

Basketball

Men's basketball is tradition rich at Oklahoma State. Oklahoma State made the Final Four in 1995 and 2004 and was the first ever Division 1 basketball program to win back-to-back National Championships in 1945–1946.

Wrestling

The Cowboy wrestling team brought home their 33rd NCAA championship in spring 2005, scoring the most points ever by an Oklahoma State wrestling team in the NCAA. OSU won their 34th overall (and 4th consecutive) title in 2006. OSU's 34 team titles are the most ever collected by a school in one sport. The Cowboys have also produced 127 individual national champions, including the sport's first-ever four-time champion, Pat Smith.

Other sports
Since the 1924 Olympics, 68 Oklahoma State University Olympians have won a total of 30 medals: 21 gold, four silver, and five bronze.

Fight songs
Notable among a number of songs commonly played and sung at various events such as commencement, convocation, and athletic games are: The Waving Song, Ride 'Em Cowboys (the Oklahoma State University fight song), and the OSU Chant. At the end of every sporting event (except football), win or lose, OSU student-athletes face the student section and sing the alma mater along with other students, faculty, alumni and staff.

People

Alumni
Today, there are more than 200,000 living OSU alumni worldwide. Prominent alumni include oil tycoon and billionaire philanthropist T. Boone Pickens, actor James Marsden, "the father of the personal computer" Ed Roberts, country singers Garth Brooks and Hoyt Axton, Governor of Oklahoma Kevin Stitt, former Prime Minister of South Korea Nam Duck-woo, former Prime Minister of Jordan Adnan Badran, former U.S. Senator Tom Coburn, former Governor of Oklahoma Mary Fallin,  former acting Surgeon General of the United States Robert A. Whitney, Oklahoma Supreme Court Justice Steven W. Taylor, David Noel Ramírez Padilla rector of Tecnológico de Monterrey Mexico's most prestigious university, former Central Bank of Somalia Governor Yussur A.F. Abrar, production designer and drummer K.K. Barrett, legal scholar Anita Hill, and Ponnala Lakshmaiah, an Indian politician.

Interviews with OSU Alumni can be viewed and heard through the O-State Stories Project of the Oklahoma Oral History Research Program.

Athletics
Coaching alumni include OSU wrestling head coach John Smith, OSU football head coach Mike Gundy, and former OSU basketball coaches Eddie Sutton and Sean Sutton. The Cowboys have produced several NBA players, including Cade Cunningham, the number one overall pick in the 2021 NBA Draft, Desmond Mason, formerly of the Oklahoma City Thunder, Marcus Smart of the Boston Celtics, Jawun Evans of the Los Angeles Clippers, Tony Allen of the New Orleans Pelicans, James Anderson of the Sacramento Kings, Joey Graham of the Cleveland Cavaliers, Stephen Graham of the New Jersey Nets, JamesOn Curry of the Chicago Bulls, Terrel Harris of the Miami Heat, and former New York Knicks guard John Starks. NFL players Barry Sanders and Thurman Thomas also attended OSU, as did baseball All-Star pitcher Joe Horlen and All-Star third baseman Robin Ventura. Ventura went on to manage the Chicago White Sox for five seasons. Also in the NFL are former Cowboys Dez Bryant and Dan Bailey of the Dallas Cowboys, and Kevin Williams of the Minnesota Vikings. Retired MMA and UFC Hall of Famers Randy Couture and Don Frye, and former UFC welterweight champion Johny Hendricks wrestled at OSU. Former UFC light heavyweight champion Daniel Cormier wrestled at the university, as well as other MMA fighters including Mark Muñoz. PGA professional golfers Rickie Fowler, Scott Verplank, Bo Van Pelt, Charles Howell III, Bob Tway, Hunter Mahan, Viktor Hovland, Kristoffer Ventura, Talor Gooch and Matthew Wolff also attended OSU. Two-time gold medalist, ESPN analyst,  and ASA Hall of Fame inductee Michele Mary Smith played softball at OSU. Houston Nutt and Brent Guy, both former players and teammates, became head coaches after serving as assistants for the Cowboy football program.

Faculty
A number of prominent scholars, authors and researchers have served on the OSU faculty, including poet Ai, historian Angie Debo, literary critic and author Brian Evenson, mathematician William Jaco, computer scientist and philosopher Subhash Kak, chemical engineering scholar Nicholas A. Kotov,  information studies pioneer and research librarian Edmon Low, and engineering pioneer J. Tinsley Oden.

In recent decades, number of notable academic administrators have served on the Oklahoma State faculty, including Guy Bailey (who would serve as President of the University of Alabama), Ray M. Bowen (who served as President of Texas A&M), Hilton Briggs (who served as President of South Dakota State University), Robert W. MacVicar (who went on to become President of Oregon State University), James E. Martin (who served as president at Auburn and the University of Arkansas), J. Tinsley Oden (who served as Provost for the University of Texas at Austin), V. Burns Hargis (President of Oklahoma State University), and Paul Torgersen (who served as President of Virginia Tech).

Campus buildings
Listed below are just a few of the buildings at OSU. For a complete list, visit List of Oklahoma State University buildings.

Academic buildings

 4-H Youth Development
 Advanced Technology Research Center
 Agriculture
 Agriculture North
 Animal Sciences
 Bartlett Center for the Visual Arts
 Biosystems and Agriculture Engineering Lab
 Classroom Building
 Colvin Center
 Donald W. Reynolds School of Architecture
 Edmon Low Library
 Endeavor Lab
 Engineering North
 Engineering South
 General Academic Building (former Spears School of Business)
 Gundersen
 Henry Bellmon Research Center
 Human Sciences
 Human Sciences West
 Life Sciences East
 Life Sciences West
 Mathematical Sciences
 McElroy Hall
 Morrill Hall
 Social Sciences And Humanities
 Noble Research Center
 North Classroom
 Psychology
 Old Central 
 Paul Miller Journalism and Broadcasting Center
 Physical Sciences
 Robert M. Kerr Food & Agricultural Products
 Seretean Center for the Performing Arts
 Spears School of Business
 Wes Watkins Center for International Trade Development
 Whitehurst Hall
 Willard Hall

Residential buildings

 Allen Hall
 Cordell Hall (now closed)
 Davis Hall
 Drummond Hall (now closed)
 Kerr Hall (now closed)
 Morsani-Smith
 Parker Hall
 Wentz Hall
 Patchin Hall
 Jones Hall
 Booker Hall
 Stinchcomb Hall
 Iba Hall
 Bennett Hall
 Stout Hall
 University Commons
 University Village Suites
 Willham North Hall (now closed)
 Willham South Hall (now closed)

Other buildings

 O'Brate Stadium – Baseball
 Bennett Memorial Chapel
 Boone Pickens Stadium – Football stadium named after T. Boone Pickens
 Cowgirl Stadium
 Historic Gallagher-Iba Arena – Named top collegiate venue in the United States by CBS Sportsline. It is named after Edward C. Gallagher and Henry Iba. It is home to practice facilities, weight and locker rooms as well as the original white maple wood basketball court. The court is named Eddie Sutton Court, in honor of the former OSU Men's Basketball Coach. Sutton led the Cowboys to two Final Four appearances during his time as coach.
 National Wrestling Hall of Fame and Museum
 Student Union – Known as the largest student union in the world. Portions of the 1992 film All-American Murder were filmed at the Student Union.
 Whitehurst Hall administration building

See also

 Gift of a Lifetime
 Johnny Bright incident – An incident that occurred during a football game on Saturday, October 20, 1951
 List of forestry universities and colleges

Oklahoma Agricultural Experiment Station

Notes

References

External links

 
 Oklahoma State Athletics website
 

Buildings and structures in Stillwater, Oklahoma
Education in Payne County, Oklahoma
Educational institutions established in 1890
Land-grant universities and colleges
 
Veterinary schools in the United States
Tourist attractions in Stillwater, Oklahoma
1890 establishments in Oklahoma Territory
Universities and colleges accredited by the Higher Learning Commission